HMS Sir Thomas Picton was a First World War Royal Navy . Sir Thomas Picton was the only Royal Navy ship ever named for Sir Thomas Picton, a British general of the Peninsular War who was killed at the Battle of Waterloo. The ship's original 12" main battery was stripped from the obsolete  .

The Lord Clive-class monitors were originally built in 1915 to engage German shore artillery in occupied Belgium during the First World War. Sir Thomas Picton, however was differently employed, being dispatched to the Eastern Mediterranean upon completion for service with the fleet there alongside her sister Earl of Peterborough. Early in 1916 she shelled Turkish positions at the Dardanelles and during the remainder of the war was active against Turkish units in Egypt, Palestine and Turkey itself.

Following the armistice in November 1918, Sir Thomas Picton and her sisters were put into reserve pending scrapping, as the reason for their existence ended with the liberation of Central Power-held coastlines. In 1921 Sir Thomas Picton was scrapped along with all her sisters.

References 
 
 
 
 

 

Lord Clive-class monitors
Ships built in Belfast
1915 ships
World War I monitors of the United Kingdom
Royal Navy ship names
Ships built by Harland and Wolff